Periboea is the name of several figures in Greek mythology.

Periboea may also refer to:
 Periboea (annelid), genus of polychaete worms in the family Hesionidae
 Periboea (plant), genus of flowering plants in the family Hyacinthaceae
 Periboea, a genus of true bugs in the family Pentatomidae; synonym of Diaphyta